Kosh-Korgon is a village in the Chüy District, Chüy Region, Kyrgyzstan. Its population was 2,317 in 2021. It is the center and the only village in Koshkorgon rural community (ayyl aymagy).

References

Populated places in Chüy Region